Lunzer is a surname. Notable people with the surname include:

Alois Lunzer (1840–?), Austrian-born painter
Jack V. Lunzer (1924–2016), Belgian-born British industrial diamond merchant

See also
Linzer
Munzer